Belle of Alaska is a 1922 American silent Western film directed by Chester Bennett and starring J. Frank Glendon, Jane Novak and Noah Beery.

A Kansas farmer and his wife leave for Alaska to take part in the Klondike Gold Rush, but she becomes separated from him and ends up working in a dance hall owned by the gambler Lucky Vail.

Cast
 J. Frank Glendon as Lucky Vail
 Jane Novak as Ruth Harkin
 Noah Beery Sr. as Wade Harkin
 Florence Carpenter as Chicago Belle
 Les Bates as Dugan

References

External links
 

1922 films
1922 Western (genre) films
1920s historical films
American black-and-white films
American historical films
Films directed by Chester Bennett
Films set in Alaska
Films set in the 1890s
Silent American Western (genre) films
1920s English-language films
1920s American films